is an initiative aimed at the valorization and transmission to the next generation of the tangible and intangible natural, cultural, historical, and industrial heritage of Hokkaidō, Japan. Sixty-seven assets have been identified to date in three sessions, the first twenty-five on 22 October 2001, a further twenty-seven on 22 October 2004, and more recently, fifteen on 1 November 2018. The scheme does not include a formal system for management or preservation but is intended to be a citizen-led movement with the concomitant benefits of promoting tourism, fostering pride and a sense of belonging in local communities, developing human capital and potential, and the revitalization of local economies.

See also

 Cultural Properties of Japan
 Japan Heritage
 List of Historic Sites of Japan (Hokkaidō)
 List of Cultural Properties of Japan - structures (Hokkaidō)
 List of Natural Monuments of Japan (Hokkaidō)

References

External links
  List (Hokkaidō Government)
  List (Hokkaidō Heritage Council)

Hokkaido